Blackhawk is the debut studio album by the American country music group of the same name. Released in 1994 on Arista Nashville, it was certified 2× Platinum by the RIAA for shipping two million copies. The album produced the singles "Goodbye Says It All", "Every Once in a While", "I Sure Can Smell the Rain", "Down in Flames", and "That's Just About Right".

Contents
Five singles were released from the album, four of which were top ten hits on the Billboard charts. The lead-off single "Goodbye Says It All" reached number 11.

"Goodbye Says It All", "Every Once in a While", "I Sure Can Smell the Rain" and "That's Just About Right" all had accompanying music videos. "Love Like This" was later recorded by Carlene Carter and released as the first single from her 1995 album Little Acts of Treason.

Critical reception
CMT would later reflect that the album "unleash[ed] an electrifying three-part harmony with its luring grunge edge." The network also lauded the songwriting skills displayed and the "scorching rock-belted instrumentation."

Track listing

Personnel

BlackHawk
Henry Paul – lead vocals, mandolin, acoustic guitar
Dave Robbins – keyboard, baritone vocals
Van Stephenson – electric guitar, tenor vocals

Additional musicians
Mike Chapman – bass guitar
Dan Dugmore – acoustic guitar
Randy Howard – fiddle
Dann Huff – electric guitar
Mary Ann Kennedy – mandolin
Kenny Malone – percussion
Kerry Marx – electric guitar
Dale Oliver – electric guitar
Danny Parks – electric guitar
Kip Raines – drums
Eric Silver – acoustic guitar, fiddle, mandolin
Biff Watson – acoustic guitar
John Willis – acoustic guitar, electric guitar
Lonnie Wilson – drums

Chart performance

Weekly charts

Year-end charts

Singles

Certifications

References

1994 debut albums
Arista Records albums
Blackhawk (band) albums
Albums produced by Mark Bright (record producer)